Eugenio Serrano Gispert (born April 14, 1960) is a former Spanish handball player who competed in the 1980, 1984 and 1988 Summer Olympics.

In 1980, he was part of the Spanish team which finished fifth in the Olympic tournament. He played all six matches and scored twenty goals.

Four years later, he finished eighth with the Spanish team in the 1984 Olympic tournament. He played all six matches and scored 14 goals.

In 1988, he was a member of the Spanish team which finished ninth in the Olympic tournament. He played all six matches and scored 24 goals.

References

1960 births
Living people
Spanish male handball players
Olympic handball players of Spain
Handball players at the 1980 Summer Olympics
Handball players at the 1984 Summer Olympics
Handball players at the 1988 Summer Olympics
Handball players from Catalonia
BM Granollers players
FC Barcelona Handbol players